The 1922 Auburn Tigers football team represented Auburn University in the 1922 college football season. It was the Tigers' 31st overall and they competed as a member of the Southern Conference (SoCon). The team was led by head coach Mike Donahue, in his 18th year, and played their home games at Drake Field in Auburn, Alabama. They finished with a record of eight wins and two losses (8–2 overall, 2–1 in the SoCon). It was considered one of best teams Auburn turned out in the first half of the 20th century.

Schedule

Source: 1922 Auburn football schedule

References

Auburn
Auburn Tigers football seasons
Auburn Tigers football